Bo Lindor Holmberg (17 November 1942 – 11 February 2010), born in Härnösand, Västernorrlands län, Sweden, was a Swedish politician, Governor of Södermanland, and husband of former Minister for Foreign Affairs Anna Lindh.

Biography
Holmberg's first major political assignment was as a Commissioner of the Västernorrland County Council from 1976 to 1982. In 1982, he was made minister for physical planning and local government in the newly elected Social Democrat Government, and in the following year minister for civil service affairs, on which post he remained until 1988. He then served as a Member of the Parliament for his home constituency of Västernorrland until being appointed Governor of Södermanland on 1 July 1996. His term ended in 2005.

Holmberg was married to Lindh from 1991 until she was assassinated in 2003. They had two sons, David and Filip.

Holmberg died on 11 February 2010 at age 67.

See also

List of Södermanland Governors, Government of Sweden

References

 SvD: "Jag kan höra Anna skratta"
 Aftonbladet: Bo Holmberg har avlidit

1942 births
2010 deaths
County governors of Sweden
People from Härnösand
Government ministers of Sweden
Members of the Riksdag from the Social Democrats
20th-century Swedish politicians
21st-century Swedish politicians